Granville may refer to:

People and fictional characters
Granville (name), including a list of people and fictional characters with the name
Earl Granville, a title in the Peerage of Great Britain and of the UK
Baron Granville, a title in the Peerage of England
Granville Henderson Oury, 19th century American politician, lawyer, judge, soldier, and miner.

Places

Australia
 Granville, New South Wales
 Municipality of Granville
 Electoral district of Granville
 Granville, Queensland, a suburb of Maryborough
 Shire of Granville, Queensland
 County of Granville, South Australia
 Granville Harbour, Tasmania

Canada
 Granville, Edmonton, Alberta
 Granville, British Columbia, former name of Vancouver
 Granville Island, a peninsula in Vancouver
 Granville Street, a major road in Vancouver
 Vancouver Granville (electoral district)

United States

 Granville, Illinois
 Granville, Indiana, a former town in Wayne Township, Tippecanoe County
 Granville, Delaware County, Indiana
 Granville, Iowa
 Granville, Massachusetts
Granville State Forest
 Granville, Missouri
 Granville, New York
 Granville (village), New York
 Granville County, North Carolina
 Granville District, of the 18th century Province of North Carolina
 Granville line, a geographic feature in North Carolina
 Granville, North Dakota
 Granville, Ohio
 Granville South, Ohio
 Granville, Pennsylvania
 Granville, Tennessee
 Granville, Vermont
 Granville Notch, a mountain pass in Vermont
 Granville, Virginia
 Granville, West Virginia
 Granville, Wisconsin, a former town in Wisconsin

Other countries
 Granville, Manche, France
 Canton of Granville
 Granville, Jamaica
 Granville Town, now Cline Town, Freetown, Sierra Leone
 Granville, County Tyrone, Northern Ireland, UK
 Granville Fjord, Greenland

Businesses
 Granville Brothers Aircraft, an American manufacturer 1929–1934
 Granville Technology Group, a former British computer company
 The Granville Hotel, Ramsgate, England

Schools
 Granville Academy, Woodville, Derbyshire, UK
 Granville Christian Academy, Granville, Ohio, US
 Granville High School, Granville, Ohio, US

Transportation
 Granville Airport, Washington County, New York, US
 Granville station (CTA), Chicago, Illinois, US
 Granville station (SkyTrain), Vancouver, British Columbia, Canada
 Granville railway station, Sydney, Australia
 Gare de Granville, Granville, Manche, France
 Granville Street railway station, Birmingham, UK
 Granville Road, Tsim Sha Tsui, Hong Kong

Naval ships
 , several ships of the Argentine Navy
 , a US Navy attack transport

Other uses
 Granville (American band)
 Granville (French band)
 Granville (horse) (1933–1951)
 Granville F.C., a 19th-century Scottish football club
 US Granville, a French football club

See also

Granville Bridge (disambiguation)
Granville Mall (disambiguation)
Granville Station (disambiguation)
 Granville Raid, a German World War II
Grandville (disambiguation)
Grantville (disambiguation)
Grenville (disambiguation)
Troxel v. Granville, a 2000 U.S. Supreme Court case